Stefano Abbati (born 23 February 1955) is an Italian actor. He appeared in more than sixty films since 1983.

Selected filmography

References

External links 

1955 births
Living people
Italian male film actors
20th-century Italian male actors
21st-century Italian male actors